State Route 247 (SR 247) is a  route that serves as a connection between State Route 24 east of Halltown with U.S. Route 72 (US 72) west of Muscle Shoals.

Route description

SR 247 begins at an intersection with SR 24 east of Halltown. From this point, the route travels in a northeasterly direction to its northern end at US 72 to the west of Muscle Shoals.

Major intersections

References

247
247
Transportation in Franklin County, Alabama
Transportation in Colbert County, Alabama